Edgerly Island is an island in the Napa River, upstream of San Pablo Bay (an embayment of San Francisco Bay). It is in Napa County, California, and managed as part of the Napa-Sonoma Marshes Wildlife Area.

References

Islands of Napa County, California
Islands of Northern California
San Pablo Bay